is a national park in the Akaishi Mountains, Chūbu region, Honshū, Japan.

The Minami Alps National Park was established on June 1, 1964.

The Park is a very mountainous region, centering on the Akaishi Mountains with several noted peaks of over 3000 meters in height, including Senjō-ga-take, Kita-dake, Aino-dake, Shiomi-dake, Arakawa-take,  Akaishi-dake and Hijiri-dake.

The park also protects the headwaters of the Fuji River, Ōi River and Tenryū River.

Flora in the park includes extensive stands of Japanese beech, Japanese stone pine and hemlock spruce. The largest fauna is the kamoshika and noted avian species include the ptarmigan. The park has minimal public facilities, and the only approach is by mountaineering.

Other large fauna include Asiatic black bear, wild boar and Sika deer.

See also 
 Akaishi Mountains
 Japanese Alps
 List of national parks of Japan

References

Further reading 
 Hunt, Paul. Hiking in Japan: An Adventurer's Guide to the Mountain Trails. Kodansha America (1988). 
 Southerland, Mary and Britton, Dorothy. The National Parks of Japan. Kodansha International (1995).

External links 

 Official Minami Alps National Park website
 Ministry of the Environment Minami Alps National Park website

 
National parks of Japan
Akaishi Mountains
Parks and gardens in Yamanashi Prefecture
Parks and gardens in Shizuoka Prefecture
Parks and gardens in Nagano Prefecture
Protected areas established in 1964
1964 establishments in Japan
Japan Alps